Julia Griffiths (21 May 1811 – 1895) was a British abolitionist who worked with the American former slave Frederick Douglass. The two met in London, England, during Douglass's tour of the British Isles in 1845–47. In 1849, Griffiths joined Douglass in Rochester, New York, and edited, published and promoted his work. She was one of six founding members of the influential Rochester Ladies Anti-Slavery Society. She is most noted for publishing Autographs for Freedom, an anthology of anti-slavery literature. In 1854, there were unfounded accusations, leveled by William Lloyd Garrison, that Douglass and Griffiths engaged in infidelity. Griffiths returned to England in 1855, where she continued to organize ladies' anti-slavery societies, write columns for Douglass's newspapers, and raise funds for the Rochester Ladies Anti-Slavery Sewing Society, later called the Rochester Ladies' Anti-Slavery and Freedmen's Aid Society. In 1859, she married Henry O. Crofts, a Methodist minister and former missionary in Canada. After her husband's death, Crofts ran a school for girls in St. Neots.

References

Further reading

External links 
 
 
 
 Rochester Ladies' Anti-Slavery Society Papers at the William L. Clements Library

British abolitionists
1811 births
1895 deaths
Frederick Douglass